The chief minister of the Northern Territory is the head of government of the Northern Territory. The office is the equivalent of a state premier.  
When the Northern Territory Legislative Assembly was created in 1974, the head of government was officially known as majority leader. This title was used in the first parliament (1974–1977) and the first eighteen months of the second. When self-government was granted the Northern Territory in 1978, the title of the head of government became chief minister.

The chief minister is formally appointed by the administrator, who in normal circumstances will appoint the head of whichever party holds the majority of seats in the unicameral Legislative Assembly. In times of constitutional crisis, the administrator can appoint someone else as chief minister, though this has never occurred.

Since 13 May 2022, following the resignation of Michael Gunner, the chief minister is Natasha Fyles of the Labor Party. She is the second female chief minister of the Northern Territory.

History
The Country Liberal Party won the first Northern Territory election on 19 October 1974 and elected Goff Letts majority leader. He headed an Executive that carried out most of the functions of a ministry at the state level.  At the 1977 election Letts lost his seat and party leadership. He was succeeded on 13 August 1977 by Paul Everingham (CLP) as Majority Leader. When the Territory attained self-government on 1 July 1978, Everingham became chief minister with greatly expanded powers.

In 2001, Clare Martin became the first Labor and female chief minister of the Northern Territory. Until 2004 the conduct of elections and drawing of electoral boundaries was performed by the Northern Territory Electoral Office, a unit of the Department of the chief minister. In March 2004 the independent Northern Territory Electoral Commission was established.

In 2013, Mills was replaced as chief minister and CLP leader by Adam Giles at the 2013 CLP leadership ballot on 13 March to become the first indigenous Australian to lead a state or territory government in Australia.

Following the 2016 election landslide outcome, Labor's Michael Gunner became chief minister; he was the first Chief Minister who was born in the Northern Territory. On 10 May 2022, Gunner announced his intention to resign. On 13 May 2022, Natasha Fyles was elected to the position by the Labor caucus.

List of chief ministers of the Northern Territory
From the foundation of the Northern Territory Legislative Assembly in 1974 until the granting of self-government in 1978, the head of government was known as the majority leader:

From 1978, the position was known as the chief minister:

See also 
 List of chief ministers of the Northern Territory by time in office
 Territory rig

References

External links
 Legislative Assembly of the Northern Territory 1974–2012 – Office Holders

Northern Territory
Northern Territory-related lists
Northern Territory ministries